Wafer (Weafer, Weaver) is an English surname, and may refer to

Jeremy Wafer (born 1952), South African Artist
Ken Weafer (1913–2005), American baseball player and second cousin of Jeremy Wafer
Von Wafer (born 1985), American Basketball player

See also 
Wafer (electronics)
Wafer (cooking)
Weaver (disambiguation), an English variant
Wever (disambiguation), a Dutch variant
Weber, a German variant
Webber (surname), an English variant